Terezyne is an urban-type settlement in the Bila Tserkva Raion (district) of Kyiv Oblast (province) in northern Ukraine. It belongs to Bila Tserkva urban hromada, one of the hromadas of Ukraine.  Its population was 1,562 at the 2001 Ukrainian Census. Current population: .

References

Urban-type settlements in Bila Tserkva Raion